The Aydın Subregion (Turkish: Aydın Alt Bölgesi) (TR32) is a statistical subregion in Turkey.

Provinces 

 Aydın Province (TR321)
 Denizli Province (TR322)
 Muğla Province (TR323)

See also 

 NUTS of Turkey

External links 
 TURKSTAT

Sources 
 ESPON Database

Statistical subregions of Turkey